Static force fields are fields, such as a simple electric, magnetic or gravitational fields, that exist without excitations. The most common approximation method that physicists use for scattering calculations can be interpreted as static forces arising from the interactions between two bodies mediated by virtual particles, particles that exist for only a short time determined by the uncertainty principle. The virtual particles, also known as force carriers, are bosons, with different bosons associated with each force.

The virtual-particle description of static forces is capable of identifying the spatial form of the forces, such as the inverse-square behavior in Newton's law of universal gravitation and in Coulomb's law. It is also able to predict whether the forces are attractive or repulsive for like bodies.

The path integral formulation is the natural language for describing force carriers. This article uses the path integral formulation to describe the force carriers for spin 0, 1, and 2 fields. Pions, photons, and gravitons fall into these respective categories.

There are limits to the validity of the virtual particle picture. The virtual-particle formulation is derived from a method known as perturbation theory which is an approximation assuming interactions are not too strong, and was intended for scattering problems, not bound states such as atoms. For the strong force binding quarks into nucleons at low energies, perturbation theory has never been shown to yield results in accord with experiments, thus, the validity of the "force-mediating particle" picture is questionable. Similarly, for bound states the method fails. In these cases, the physical interpretation must be re-examined. As an example, the calculations of atomic structure in atomic physics or of molecular structure in quantum chemistry could not easily be repeated, if at all, using the "force-mediating particle" picture.

Use of the "force-mediating particle" picture (FMPP) is unnecessary in nonrelativistic quantum mechanics, and Coulomb's law is used as given in atomic physics and quantum chemistry to calculate both bound and scattering states. A non-perturbative relativistic quantum theory, in which Lorentz invariance is preserved, is achievable by evaluating Coulomb's law as a 4-space interaction using the 3-space position vector of a reference electron obeying Dirac's equation and the quantum trajectory of a second electron which depends only on the scaled time. The quantum trajectory of each electron in an ensemble is inferred from the Dirac current for each electron by setting it equal to a velocity field times a quantum density, calculating a position field from the time integral of the velocity field, and finally calculating a quantum trajectory from the expectation value of the position field. The quantum trajectories are of course spin dependent, and the theory can be validated by checking that Pauli's exclusion principle is obeyed for a collection of fermions.

Classical forces

The force exerted by one mass on another and the force exerted by one charge on another are strikingly similar. Both fall off as the square of the distance between the bodies. Both are proportional to the product of properties of the bodies, mass in the case of gravitation and charge in the case of electrostatics.

They also have a striking difference. Two masses attract each other, while two like charges repel each other.

In both cases, the bodies appear to act on each other over a distance. The concept of field was invented to mediate the interaction among bodies thus eliminating the need for action at a distance. The gravitational force is mediated by the gravitational field and the Coulomb force is mediated by the electromagnetic field.

Gravitational force

The gravitational force on a mass  exerted by another mass  is

The force can also be written

where  is the gravitational field described by the field equation

where  is the mass density at each point in space.

Coulomb force

The electrostatic Coulomb force on a charge  exerted by a charge  is (SI units)

The Coulomb force can also be written in terms of an electrostatic field:

where

 being the charge density at each point in space.

Virtual-particle exchange

In perturbation theory, forces are generated by the exchange of virtual particles. The mechanics of virtual-particle exchange is best described with the path integral formulation of quantum mechanics. There are insights that can be obtained, however, without going into the machinery of path integrals, such as why classical gravitational and electrostatic forces fall off as the inverse square of the distance between bodies.

Path-integral formulation of virtual-particle exchange

A virtual particle is created by a disturbance to the vacuum state, and the virtual particle is destroyed when it is absorbed back into the vacuum state by another disturbance. The disturbances are imagined to be due to bodies that interact with the virtual particle’s field.

The probability amplitude
Using natural units, the probability amplitude for the creation, propagation, and destruction of a virtual particle is given, in the path integral formulation by

where  is the Hamiltonian operator,  is elapsed time,  is the energy change due to the disturbance,  is the change in action due to the disturbance,  is the field of the virtual particle, the integral is over all paths, and the classical action is given by

where  is the Lagrangian density.

Here, the spacetime metric is given by

The path integral often can be converted to the form

The first term in the argument represents the free particle and the second term represents the disturbance to the field from an external source such as a charge or a mass.

The integral can be written (see )

where

is the change in the action due to the disturbances and the propagator  is the solution of

Energy of interaction

We assume that there are two point disturbances representing two bodies and that the disturbances are motionless and constant in time. The disturbances can be written

If we neglect self-interactions of the disturbances then W becomes

which can be written

Here  is the Fourier transform of

Finally, the change in energy due to the static disturbances of the vacuum is

If this quantity is negative, the force is attractive. If it is positive, the force is repulsive.

Examples of static, motionless, interacting currents are the Yukawa potential, the Coulomb potential in a vacuum, and the Coulomb potential in a simple plasma or electron gas.

The expression for the interaction energy can be generalized to the situation in which the point particles are moving, but the motion is slow compared with the speed of light. Examples are the Darwin interaction in a vacuum and in a plasma.

Finally, the expression for the interaction energy can be generalized to situations in which the disturbances are not point particles, but are possibly line charges, tubes of charges, or current vortices. Examples include: two line charges embedded in a plasma or electron gas, Coulomb potential between two current loops embedded in a magnetic field, and the magnetic interaction between current loops in a simple plasma or electron gas. As seen from the Coulomb interaction between tubes of charge example, shown below, these more complicated geometries can lead to such exotic phenomena as fractional quantum numbers.

Selected examples

The Yukawa potential: The force between two nucleons in an atomic nucleus

Consider the spin-0 Lagrangian density

The equation of motion for this Lagrangian is the Klein–Gordon equation

If we add a disturbance the probability amplitude becomes

If we integrate by parts and neglect boundary terms at infinity the probability amplitude becomes

With the amplitude in this form it can be seen that the propagator is the solution of

From this it can be seen that

The energy due to the static disturbances becomes (see )

with

which is attractive and has a range of 

Yukawa proposed that this field describes the force between two nucleons in an atomic nucleus. It allowed him to predict both the range and the mass of the particle, now known as the pion, associated with this field.

Electrostatics

The Coulomb potential in a vacuum
Consider the spin-1 Proca Lagrangian with a disturbance

where

charge is conserved

and we choose the Lorenz gauge

Moreover, we assume that there is only a time-like component  to the disturbance. In ordinary language, this means that there is a charge at the points of disturbance, but there are no electric currents.

If we follow the same procedure as we did with the Yukawa potential we find that

which implies

and

This yields

for the timelike propagator and

which has the opposite sign to the Yukawa case.

In the limit of zero photon mass, the Lagrangian reduces to the Lagrangian for electromagnetism

Unlike the Yukawa case, like bodies, in this electrostatic case, repel each other.

Coulomb potential in a simple plasma or electron gas

Plasma waves

The dispersion relation for plasma waves is

where  is the angular frequency of the wave,

Retardation effects have been neglected in obtaining the plasma-wave dispersion relation.

For low frequencies, the dispersion relation becomes

where

is the Debye number, which is the inverse of the Debye length. This suggests that the propagator is

In fact, if the retardation effects are not neglected, then the dispersion relation is

which does indeed yield the guessed propagator. This propagator is the same as the massive Coulomb propagator with the mass equal to the inverse Debye length. The interaction energy is therefore

The Coulomb potential is screened on length scales of a Debye length.

Plasmons

In a quantum electron gas, plasma waves are known as plasmons. Debye screening is replaced with Thomas–Fermi screening to yield

where the inverse of the Thomas–Fermi screening length is

This expression can be derived from the chemical potential for an electron gas and from Poisson's equation. The chemical potential for an electron gas near equilibrium is constant and given by

where  is the electric potential. Linearizing the Fermi energy to first order in the density fluctuation and combining with Poisson's equation yields the screening length. The force carrier is the quantum version of the plasma wave.

Two line charges embedded in a plasma or electron gas

We consider a line of charge with axis in the z direction embedded in an electron gas

where  is the distance in the xy-plane from the line of charge,  is the width of the material in the z direction. The superscript 2 indicates that the Dirac delta function is in two dimensions. The propagator is

where  is either the inverse Debye–Hückel screening length or the inverse Thomas–Fermi screening length.

The interaction energy is

In obtaining the interaction energy we made use of the integrals (see )

and

For , we have

Coulomb potential between two current loops embedded in a magnetic field

Interaction energy for vortices

We consider a charge density in tube with axis along a magnetic field embedded in an electron gas

where  is the distance from the guiding center,  is the width of the material in the direction of the magnetic field

where the cyclotron frequency is (Gaussian units)

and

is the speed of the particle about the magnetic field, and B is the magnitude of the magnetic field. The speed formula comes from setting the classical kinetic energy equal to the spacing between Landau levels in the quantum treatment of a charged particle in a magnetic field.

In this geometry, the interaction energy can be written

In obtaining the interaction energy we made use of the integral

Electric field due to a density perturbation

The chemical potential near equilibrium, is given by

The density fluctuation is then

where  is the area of the material in the plane perpendicular to the magnetic field.

Poisson's equation yields

where

The propagator is then

and the interaction energy becomes

where in the second equality (Gaussian units) we assume that the vortices had the same energy and the electron charge.

In analogy with plasmons, the force carrier is the quantum version of the upper hybrid oscillation which is a longitudinal plasma wave that propagates perpendicular to the magnetic field.

Currents with angular momentum

Delta function currents

Unlike classical currents, quantum current loops can have various values of the Larmor radius for a given energy. Landau levels, the energy states of a charged particle in the presence of a magnetic field, are multiply degenerate. The current loops correspond to angular momentum states of the charged particle that may have the same energy. Specifically, the charge density is peaked around radii of

where  is the angular momentum quantum number. When  we recover the classical situation in which the electron orbits the magnetic field at the Larmor radius. If currents of two angular momentum  and  interact, and we assume the charge densities are delta functions at radius , then the interaction energy is

The energy for two different values is given in Figure 2.

Quasiparticles

For large values of angular momentum, the energy can have local minima at distances other than zero and infinity. It can be numerically verified that the minima occur at

This suggests that the pair of particles that are bound and separated by a distance  act as a single quasiparticle with angular momentum .

where

However the value of the energy at the minimum depends on the ratio. The lowest energy minimum occurs when

When the ratio differs from 1, then the energy minimum is higher (Figure 3). Therefore, for even values of total momentum, the lowest energy occurs when (Figure 4)

or

where the total angular momentum is written as

When the total angular momentum is odd, the minima cannot occur for  The lowest energy states for odd total angular momentum occur when

or

and

which also appear as series for the filling factor in the fractional quantum Hall effect.

Charge density spread over a wave function

The charge density is not actually concentrated in a delta function. The charge is spread over a wave function. In that case the electron density is

The interaction energy becomes

where  is a confluent hypergeometric function or Kummer function. In obtaining the interaction energy we have used the integral (see )

Also, as with the delta function charges, the energy at the minimum increases as the ratio of angular momenta varies from one. Therefore, the series

and

appear as well in the case of charges spread by the wave function.

The Laughlin wavefunction is an ansatz for the quasiparticle wavefunction. If the expectation value of the interaction energy is taken over a Laughlin wavefunction, these series are also preserved.

Magnetostatics

Darwin interaction in a vacuum

A charged moving particle can generate a magnetic field that affects the motion of another charged particle. The static version of this effect is called the Darwin interaction. To calculate this, consider the electrical currents in space generated by a moving charge

The Fourier transform of this current is

The current can be decomposed into a transverse and a longitudinal part (see Helmholtz decomposition).

The hat indicates a unit vector. The last term disappears because

which results from charge conservation. Here  vanishes because we are considering static forces.

With the current in this form the energy of interaction can be written

The propagator equation for the Proca Lagrangian is

The spacelike solution is

which yields

which evaluates to (see )

which reduces to

in the limit of small . The interaction energy is the negative of the interaction Lagrangian. For two like particles traveling in the same direction, the interaction is attractive, which is the opposite of the Coulomb interaction.

Darwin interaction in a plasma

In a plasma, the dispersion relation for an electromagnetic wave is 

which implies

Here  is the plasma frequency. The interaction energy is therefore

Magnetic interaction between current loops in a simple plasma or electron gas

The interaction energy

Consider a tube of current rotating in a magnetic field embedded in a simple plasma or electron gas. The current, which lies in the plane perpendicular to the magnetic field, is defined as

where

Here  indicates the dimension of the material in the direction of the magnetic field. The transverse current, perpendicular to the wave vector, drives the transverse wave.

The energy of interaction is

In obtaining the interaction energy we made use of the integrals

and

See .

A current in a plasma confined to the plane perpendicular to the magnetic field generates an extraordinary wave. This wave generates Hall currents that interact and modify the electromagnetic field. The dispersion relation for extraordinary waves is

which gives for the propagator

where

in analogy with the Darwin propagator. Here, the upper hybrid frequency is given by

the cyclotron frequency is given by (Gaussian units)

and the plasma frequency (Gaussian units)

The interaction energy becomes, for like currents,

Limit of small distance between current loops

In the limit that the distance between current loops is small,

where

and

We have made use of the integral (see )

For small  the integral becomes

For large  the integral becomes

Relation to the quantum Hall effect

The screening wavenumber can be written (Gaussian units)

where  is the fine-structure constant and the filling factor is

This parameter is important in the quantum Hall effect and the fractional quantum Hall effect. The filling factor is the fraction of occupied Landau states at the ground state energy.

For cases of interest in the quantum Hall effect,  is small. In that case the interaction energy is

where (Gaussian units)

is the interaction energy for zero filling factor. We have set the classical kinetic energy to the quantum energy

Gravitation
A gravitational disturbance is generated by the stress–energy tensor ; consequently, the Lagrangian for the gravitational field is spin-2. If the disturbances are at rest, then the only component of the stress–energy tensor that persists is the  component. If we use the same trick of giving the graviton some mass and then taking the mass to zero at the end of the calculation the propagator becomes

and

which is once again attractive rather than repulsive. The coefficients are proportional to the masses of the disturbances. In the limit of small graviton mass, we recover the inverse-square behavior of Newton's Law.

Unlike the electrostatic case, however, taking the small-mass limit of the boson does not yield the correct result. A more rigorous treatment yields a factor of one in the energy rather than 4/3.

References

Quantum field theory